Abdala or Abdalá is both a given name and a surname. It is a Spanish variation of the common Arabic name Abdullah. Notable people with the name include:

Surname
Alberto Abdala (1920–1986) Uruguayan politician, painter and Vice President of Uruguay
Carlos Abdala (1930–1976), Uruguayan politician and diplomat
Edgardo Abdala (born 1978), Chilean-born Palestinian footballer
Edílson Abdala Júnior (born 1987), Brazilian footballer
Marcelo Abdala (born 1966), Uruguayan trade union leader
Nadia Abdalá (born 1988), Mexican tennis player
Pablo Abdala (born 1966), Uruguayan politician and lawyer
Pablo Abdala (footballer) (born 1972), Argentine-born Palestinian footballer
Washington Abdala (born 1959), Uruguayan lawyer, politician and comedian
Yaquelin Abdala (born 1968), Cuban mixed-media artist

Given name
Abdalá Bucaram (born 1952), Ecuadorian politician and lawyer
Abdalá Bucaram Jr. (born 1982), Ecuadorian footballer
Abdala Faye (born 1971), Senegalese artist

Literature
 , a 1869 poem by José Martí

Other
Abdala, a Cuban COVID-19 vaccine